Timmen Cermak, M.D. is an American psychiatrist known for his work on codependent personality types. He is in private practice in San Francisco and Marin County with a focus on addictions.

He proposed that codependency be listed as a personality disorder in the Diagnostic and Statistical Manual of Mental Disorders. Cermak reasoned that when specific personality traits become excessive and maladaptive and caused significant impairment in functioning or caused significant distress, it warrants a personality disorder diagnosis.

Education
B.A., Philosophy, Ohio Wesleyan University
M.D., Case Western Reserve University

Certifications
Diploma, American Board of Psychiatry and Neurology
Certificate of Added Qualification in Addiction Psychiatry
Certified by the American Society of Addiction Medicine

References

American psychiatrists
Ohio Wesleyan University alumni
Case Western Reserve University School of Medicine alumni